Pambula Beach is a town in New South Wales, Australia not far from Pambula.

There are three surfing beaches. 1 - The Main Beach, Pambula Beach, is located in front of the Pambula Beach Holiday Hub and the surf club next door. It is the most popular of all the beaches in the town and the beach curves around the bay until it becomes Main Beach in the nearby township of Merimbula. 2 - south past the coastal rocks and cliffs, is Lions Beach. This surfing spot, named for the former sand banks, has been a surfing spot in the region. Today, however, the River Mouth suffers from lack of swell and insufficient sand banks.

References

External links
 http://www.pambulabeach.com/

Towns in New South Wales
Towns in the South Coast (New South Wales)
Beaches of New South Wales
Bega Valley Shire
Coastal towns in New South Wales